The 1896 Connecticut gubernatorial election was held on November 3, 1896. Republican nominee Lorrin A. Cooke defeated Democratic nominee Joseph B. Sargent with 62.53% of the vote.

General election

Candidates
Major party candidates
Lorrin A. Cooke, Republican
Joseph B. Sargent, Democratic

Other candidates
Lewis Sperry, National Democratic 
Edward Manchester, Prohibition
John A. Norton, Socialist Labor

Results

References

1896
Connecticut
Gubernatorial